Don José Vidal (March 12, 1763, in A Coruña, Spain – August 22, 1823, in New Orleans, Louisiana) was a Spanish grandee who served in many different roles during the last decade of Louisiana's colonial period.

Biography

Early life
Don José Vidal was born on March 12, 1765, in A Coruña, Spain.

Career
He was secretary to Manuel Gayoso de Lemos, the Spanish Governor of the Natchez District from 1792-1797.

He preferred to remain on Spanish territory, and petitioned the Spanish Governor-General Manuel Gayoso de Lemos for a land grant across the Mississippi River from Natchez. Gayoso granted the petition, with the stipulation that Vidal erect a “strong house” (fort) on the property. In 1798 Don Jose moved his family from Natchez across the river and became the Commandant of the new Post of Concordia. Don Vidal also worked to develop a town at the fort, building the first steam-powered sawmill. He also owned a cotton gin and blacksmith shop – facilities to support the town. Concordia Parish later derived its name from the fort, and the town was called Concord by 1801. The Orleans Territorial legislature in 1811 changed the name of the city to Vidalia after its founder. Vidal had donated land along the river to the city, where its civic buildings were later constructed. He also donated land for the first school in Concordia Parish.

He lived most of his later years in Vidalia, although he went to New Orleans on business.

Personal life
He was married and had children.

Death
He died August 22, 1823, in New Orleans, Louisiana. He was buried in the Natchez City Cemetery.

References
Don José Vidal

Spanish untitled nobility
1823 deaths
1763 births
18th-century Spanish people
19th-century Spanish people